The Religious Orders Study conducted at the Rush Alzheimer's Disease Center at Rush University in Chicago is a research project begun in 1994 exploring the effects of aging on the brain. More than 1,000 nuns, priests, and other religious professionals are participating across the United States. The study is finding that cognitive exercise including social activities and learning new skills has a protective effect on brain health and the onset of dementia, while negative psychological factors like anxiety and clinical depression are correlated with cognitive decline.
The Religious Orders Study follows the earlier Nun Study.
Initial funding was provided by the National Institute on Aging  in 1993.

References 

Neuroscience projects
Alzheimer's disease
Cohort studies
Rush Medical College
1994 establishments in the United States
Pathology